Itzhak "Itzik" Kala is an Israeli singer of Kurdish-Jewish descent who sings in Aramaic, Kurdish and Hebrew. He has released over 30 studio albums.

He is married to Ziona Kala.

In late 2012 his wife was severely injured by four Palestinian stone-throwers, spending several weeks in intensive care. The perpetrators (three of whom were minors) were arrested by the Israel Defense Forces in Husan.

References 

21st-century Israeli male singers
Israeli people of Kurdish-Jewish descent
Living people
1953 births

Israeli Mizrahi Jews
Israeli Sephardi Jews